Kirkkonummi (Sweden ) is a municipality of  inhabitants in southern Finland. The literal meaning of the words "Kirkkonummi" and "Kyrkslätt" in English is "church heath".

Geography

The municipality is located just outside the Helsinki Metropolitan Area, bordering the city of Espoo in the east. Other neighbouring municipalities are Vihti and Siuntio. Kirkkonummi also has excellent train and bus connections to other parts of the Greater Helsinki area, and many of its inhabitants commute daily to Helsinki.

In recent years, Kirkkonummi has faced the highest population growth rate in the country, at over 3% per annum.

Major population centres in Kirkkonummi include the municipal centre, Masala, Veikkola, Kantvik and the Upinniemi naval garrison area. In addition to these, there are dozens of smaller villages. Geographically, Kirkkonummi has two famous peninsulas, namely Porkkala and Upinniemi, the latter one of which houses a major Finnish naval base. Porkkala is also on one of the main bird migration routes in the Baltic Sea region. Additionally, Kirkkonummi has a large central plains area, through which a railway goes from Helsinki to Turku as well as extensive lake areas, much of which is relatively untouched wilderness.

Climate
Kirkkonummi has a four-season humid continental climate (Köppen: Dfb) with long, cold, snowy winters, and warm summers; spring and fall are somewhat cool and brief seasons. Similar to that of Nova Scotia or Hokkaidō. The monthly daily average temperatures range from -3.9 °C (25.0 °F) in January to 20 °C (68 °F) in July. Precipitation is well-spread throughout the year, though late spring to early summer is the driest season while late fall to winter tends to be the wettest. Its location in the very southern tip of Finland gives it a milder climate than that of northern Finland, being influenced by the North Atlantic Current and the Baltic Sea. Record temperatures range from -31.4 °C (-24.5 °F) in February, up to 34.8 °C (94.6 °F) in July.

History
Kirkkonummi has been populated from the Stone Age to the present day as evidenced by the first Stone Age rock paintings found in Finland that are located by lake Vitträsk in the central lake region of Kirkkonummi. Incidentally, these paintings were found by the famous Finnish composer Jean Sibelius himself. The southern half of the municipality was leased to the Soviet Union between 1945 and 1956 for use as a naval base as part of the peace settlement that ended the hostilities between the Soviet Union and Finland during World War II. Signs of this time include concrete bunkers, other fortifications and the remains of an airbase.

Politics
Results of the 2011 Finnish parliamentary election in Kirkkonummi:

National Coalition Party   30.7%
Social Democratic Party   16.8%
True Finns   16.3%
Swedish People's Party   14.3%
Green League   10.1%
Centre Party   4.4%
Left Alliance   3.6%
Christian Democrats   2.3%

Attractions

Places of interest located in Kirkkonummi include the medieval stone church in the municipal centre, the wooden church in the village of Haapajärvi, as well as the Hvitträsk manor designed by Finnish architects Eliel Saarinen, Herman Gesellius and Armas Lindgren.

Notable people
 Eero Saarinen (born 1910), famous architect
 Jani Hakanpää (born 1992), professional ice hockey player

International relations

Twin towns — Sister cities
Kirkkonummi is twinned with:

  Sundbyberg, Sweden  
  Paldiski, Estonia

See also 
 Finnish national road 51
 St. Michael's Church, Kirkkonummi
 Siuntio

References

External links 

  Municipality of Kirkkonummi – official website

 
Greater Helsinki
Populated coastal places in Finland
Populated places established in the 1330s